Pooja Sharma (born April 30, 1992 in Sindhupalchowk, Nepal) is a Nepalese actress, producer and also singer known for her work in Nepalese film industry. Sharma debuted as an actress in 3 Lovers (2012) where she appeared as a supporting actress. She appeared in the leading role in Madhumash, opposite actor Aaryan Sigdel. Sharma gained recognition after her role in Ajhai Pani. The turning point in her career came from the movie Prem Geet directed by Sudarshan Thapa and co-starred by Pradeep Khadka. The film was a blockbuster at the box office. Since then, she has starred in Ma Yesto Geet Gauchhu opposite Paul Shah, which was also her first production venture. It became Blockbuster at the box office. Her next film Ramkahani, a multistarrer directed by Sudarshan Thapa, was also a hit at the box office. With these achievements, she has established herself as a leading actress in Nepali film industry. before sometime she converted to Islam from Buddhist

Filmography 
Three lovers (2012)as a supporting role
 Madhumash (2013)as lead actress opposite Aryan Sigdel
 Ajhai Pani (2015) as Yunisha
Chankhe Shankhe Pankhe (2015)
 Prem Geet (2016) as Geet
Ma Yesto Geet Gauchhu (2017) as Chhayan also  debut as a producer
Mero Best Friend (2017) (special appearance)
Ram Kahani  (2018) as Maya
Samhalinchha Kahile Man (2019)
Poi Paryo Kale (2019)
Ma Yesto Geet Gauchu-2 (2022)
 Saamjhana Birsana (2022 )
 Samalinchha kahile man (2022 )

References

External links 
 

1992 births
Living people
Nepalese Hindus
People from Sindhupalchowk District
Nepalese female models
21st-century Nepalese actresses